Gnav is a traditional game that is played with either cards or wooden pieces.  Related games are Gnaio, Cuccù, Hexenspiel or Vogelspiel, Kille (also called Cambio, Campio, Camphio, Camfio or Kamfio), Coucou and Ranter Go Round. The game can be played by 20 or more players, and a minimum of two.

History of the game 

The earliest reference to the game dates to 1490 France where it was known by the name of Mécontent (Malcontent) and was played with a standard 52-card deck. Such a game is still played today in France as Coucou ("cuckoo") and also in English speaking countries as Cuckoo or Ranter-Go-Round. The earliest reference of Malcontento in Italy dates from 1547 (“Capriccio in laude del Malcontento” by Luigi Tansillo of Naples).

It was in the early 18th century that the first dedicated decks for Cuccu (Cuccù, Cucco, Cucu’ or Stu) appeared which consisted of 38 cards. The oldest known written regulation dates back to 1717 by the Al Mondo company. It was included in the deck of cards produced in Bologna by Giulio Borzaghi. In a title card of another pack, the cards were described as a new game with the Fool. As in the original card game, suits do not matter but rank is very important. The new deck reduced the cards to two identical sequences but added more ranks. The most unusual feature about the new deck was the inclusion of the Fool cards which are unranked. This may have been inspired by the Fool from tarocchi games where they are also unranked. The game was also known to be played with wooden pieces in Venice during the late 18th-century, possibly as a way of avoiding the stamp tax.

As the game migrated north through Europe in the 18th century the number of cards and the name of the game changed. In Germany, Bavaria, and Austria, for example, it became Hexenspiel ("the Witch game") and Vogelspiel ("The Bird game"). By the time that it reached Denmark as Gniao (the miaowing of a cat — "miao" in Italian), it had 42 cards.  This then became Gnav when the game was brought to Norway during the union with Denmark. Gnav was brought to the Netherlands where it became known as Slabberjan.

The game is first mentioned in Sweden in 1741, as Cambio (Italian for "exchange").  In 1833 this became Kille (probably a distortion of "Harlequin", given the special rules for the Harlequin card in the Swedish version of the game), which became the common form of the game around 1850.

Rules 
Each player receives a single card (or wooden piece) at random, and examines its value. If a player is dealt the Fool, they must knock the table to alert other players to this fact. Players also receive equal supplies of tokens. Play then proceeds by turns, starting to the left of the dealer. Each turn, a player may either choose to keep their card (saying "jeg står"), or to swap it with their left-hand neighbor  ("jeg byte"). Play continues until reaching the dealer, who has the choice of keeping their card or swapping it with the top card of the deck, drawing another card if a Horse or House is drawn. Once the dealer has had their turn, the round ends.

If a player attempts to swap their card with one of the five highest cards in the game (picture cards known as matadors), the swap is prevented and another action happens in its place, depending on the matador card held by their opponent:

 Cuckoo: the holder says "stop, cuckoo" and the round ends immediately.
 Dragoon: the holder says "cut off" ("hugg av"), and the player who tried to swap cards must pay a token to the pool. Play then proceeds with the player to the holder's left.
 Cat: the holder says "miaow" or "sst, change back" ("kiss, bytt om"), the player who tried to swap cards must pay a token to the pool, and the game is reset so that every player has the card they started with.
 Horse or House: the holder says "pass the horse" ("hest vorbi") or "pass the house" ("hus vorbi"), and the player who tried to swap cards must instead swap with the player to the left of the holder (or with the top card of the deck, if the holder is also the dealer).

When the round ends, all players reveal their cards and the player with the lowest value loses the round. (If two players are tied, they both lose.) If the lowest value card was the Fool, then both the Fool's holder and the next lowest player lose. A losing player pays one token to the pool, and is eliminated if they have no tokens left. The last player remaining is the winner.

Sets

Gnav 
The wooden pieces, in the piece version of the game, resemble the pawns in chess, with the identity of the piece being written on the base and thus invisible during play.  The deck, in the card version of the game, comprises 42 cards of a single suit, comprising two copies of 21 distinct cards, in the ranking (highest to lowest):
 Gjöken (cuckoo) — a deliberately old-fashioned spelling of "Gjøken"/"Gauken" (Bokmål/Nynorsk)
 Dragonen (dragon)
 Katten (cat)
 Hesten (horse)
 Huset (house)
 Roman numerals XII down through I, or Arabic numerals 12 down through 1
 0 (zero)
 Narren (Fool)
 Potten (pot)
 Uglen (owl)

A Hypp deck is the same as a Gnav deck but consisting of only 1 copy of the 21 distinct cards.

Slabberjan 
Similar to Gnav but with a different ranking (highest to lowest):
 Kap-af (knight)
 Vogel (bird)
 Poesje (cat)
 Herberg (inn)
 Arabic numerals 12 down through 1
 0 (zero)
 Blind (blank piece)
 Pot (pot)
 Smoel (scary face)
 Nar (fool)

Kille 

The deck comprises 42 cards of a single suit, comprising two copies of 21 distinct cards, in the ranking (highest to lowest):
 Kuku (cuckoo)
 Husar
 Husu (sow/pig)
 Kavall (horse/knight)
 Värdshus (inn)
 Fleur-de-lis pips 12 down through 1
 Kransen (wreath)
 Blompottan (flowerpot)
 Blaren (mask/face)
 Harlekin (harlequin) — this does not have a fixed place in the sequence, and its ranking depends from whether it has been dealt or exchanged

Cuccù 
The modern deck comprises 40 cards, comprising two copies of 20 distinct cards, in the ranking (highest to lowest):
	XV – Cucco (a bird looking as an owl with a crown)
	XIIII – Hai pigliato bragon (a jack with a rose in one hand)
	XIII – Salta (a rampant horse)
	XII – Gnao (a cat)
	XI – Fermatevi alquanto (an inn)
 Additive Roman numerals X down through I
	Nulla (zero)
	Secchia meno di nulla (a bucket)
	Mascherone manco di secchia (mask/face)
	Leone (a rampant lion) added in the early 19th-century
	Matto (a joker, fool) — this does not have a fixed place in the sequence.

In modern Italy, the game is played with original rules only in the small Abruzzi cities of Campli and Montorio al Vomano, both in the Teramo province. The same cards are also used in Brescia and Bergamo provinces but with different rules from the originals.

Hexenspiel 
The deck comprises 32 cards with 12 numeral cards and 10 pairs of non-identical picture cards, in the ranking (highest to lowest):
 Pfeiff (Bird)
 Werda (Guard)
 Miau (Cat)
 Hott (Horse)
 Einkerth (Inn)
 Roman numerals XII down through I
 Deller (Plate)
 Wurst (Sausages)
 Glas (Glass)
 Narr (Fool)
 Hex (Witch)

See also 
 Coucou
 Quartets (card game)

Notes 
 
  which in turn cites
 
 
 
 
 Bauer, Günther G.: "Das Salzburger Hexenspiel", in: Homo Ludens. Der Spielende Mensch II (1992), G.G. Bauer (ed.). München & Salzburg: Katzbichler, pp. 239–282 .

References

External links 
 
 Regional comparisons at old.no

Dedicated deck card games
Cuckoo group
Norwegian card games